The 6th Wildflower Film Awards is an awards ceremony recognizing the achievements of Korean independent and low-budget films. It was held at the Literature House in Seoul on April 12, 2019.

This year, nominees were selected from a list of 57 fiction films and 26 documentaries that were released in the calendar year 2018. For the first time, cash prizes of KRW20 million won ($18,000) were also given to all awards recipients sponsored by retail chain e-mart.

Nominations and winners
(Winners denoted in bold)

References

External links 

6th Wildflower Film Awards at Daum 

Wildflower Film Awards
Wildflower Film Awards
Wildflower Film Awards